Remetovac is a mountain pass over the Bilogora located near Ćurlovac, Croatia. It lies at an altitude of  m.a.s.l.

References 

Landforms of Bjelovar-Bilogora County
Landforms of Koprivnica-Križevci County